Caladenia ensigera is a plant in the orchid family Orchidaceae and is endemic to South Australia. It is a ground orchid with a single leaf and one or two greenish cream to whitish green flowers and is only known from Alligator Gorge in the Mount Remarkable National Park.

Description
The leaf and the flowering stem are densely covered with erect transparent hairs. The sepals and petals spread stiffly and widely and have thick, flat, blackish, sword-like glandular tips. Flowering occurs in August and September.

Taxonomy and naming
Caladenia ensigera was first formally described in 2006 by David Jones, who gave it the name Arachnorchis ensigera and published the description in Australian Orchid Research from a specimen collected in Alligator Gorge. In 2008, Robert Bates changed the name to Caladenia ensigera. The specific epithet (ensigera) is derived from the Latin word ensiger meaning "sword-bearing", referring to the bayonet-like tips of the sepals and petals.

Distribution and habitat
This spider orchid only occurs in Alligator Gorge in the Mount Remarkable National Park where it grows in woodland with a shrubby understorey.

References

ensigera
Plants described in 2006
Endemic orchids of Australia
Orchids of South Australia
Taxa named by David L. Jones (botanist)
Taxa named by Robert John Bates